Haya Marwan Ahmad Khalil (born 12 September 1994) is a Jordanian footballer who plays as a defender for the Jordan women's national team.

References 

1994 births
Living people
Jordanian women's footballers
Jordan women's international footballers
Women's association football defenders
Sportspeople from Amman
Footballers at the 2014 Asian Games
Asian Games competitors for Jordan